Fumbisi is a town in the Builsa South District in the Upper East Region of Ghana. The town is known for rice production. In 2019, the Paramount Chief of Fumbisi was Nab Clement Anyatuik Akanko II.

Institutions 

 St. Peter & Paul Parish
 Fumbisi Health Care Center
 Fumbisi Senior High School
 Fumbisi Rice Mill factory
 Fumbisi Rice Valley
 Fumbisi Market
 Fumbisi Police Station
 Fumbisi Clinic
 Fumbisi District Hospital

Festival 
The people of Fumbisi celebrate the Feok Festival.

References 

Communities in Ghana
Upper East Region